Echo Point is an Australian television soap opera produced by Southern Star Group for Network Ten on 1 June 1995 until 1 December 1995.

The series was devised as an attempt by the Ten Network to rival the opposition soap Home and Away on the Seven Network. The series focused on several families and teenagers in a coastal community, and a key on-going storyline concerned renewed interest in a long-unsolved local murder mystery.

Transmissions
Echo Point originally aired at 7:00pm weeknights (scheduled against Home and Away and Sale of the Century) to low ratings. The series was then shifted to the 6.00pm timeslot but was cancelled after 130 episodes had been produced. The final episodes were aired in a late night 11.30pm slot.

UK
The only two ITV stations purchased the series in the UK.  Grampian Television started screening the series from Monday, 1 September 1997 as a replacement for Paradise Beach, shown Monday to Wednesday at 17:10–17:40, until November 1997.  The series reappeared in early August 1998 when it was broadcast at 10.30am each weekday, From November 1998 it was screened each weekday at 04.30am alongside Shortland Street to clear off the episodes.

Central Television screened the series Tuesday to Thursday at 13:00–13:30 as the replacement for A Country Practice from Tuesday, 1 September 1998 and completed the series in June 1999.

New Zealand
TV3 in New Zealand picked up the series for just a few weeks in 1996 but then later cancelled, the show which featured former Shortland Street actor Martin Henderson.

Cast

In alphabetical order:

 Rose Byrne – Belinda O'Connor
 Liddy Clark – Iris Delaney
 John Clayton – Maurie Barnard
 Louise Crawford – Shelley Radcliffe
 Kimberly Davenport – Holly Winton
 Jack Ellis – Marty Radcliffe
 Philip Gordon – Daniel Blake
 Diarmid Heidenreich – Dean Loman
 Martin Henderson – Zac Brennan
 Mick Innes – Darcy Brennan

 Tom Long – Dave Campbell
 Allan Lovel – Gordon Amadio
 Rebecca Murphy – Frannie Loman
 Jessica Napier – Edwina Amadio
 Victoria Nicolls – Trish Loman
 Hayley Phillips – Lisa Loman
 Sean Scully – Neville Loman
 Rowena Wallace – Elizabeth O'Connor
 Roxane Wilson – Coral O'Connor
 David E Woodley – Hooper Hadley

References

External links
Echo Point at the National Film and Sound Archive
 

Network 10 original programming
Australian television soap operas
1995 Australian television series debuts
1995 Australian television series endings
English-language television shows
Television series by Endemol Australia